In probability theory, a mixed Poisson process is a special point process that is a generalization of a Poisson process. Mixed Poisson processes are simple example for Cox processes.

Definition 

Comment 
Mixed Poisson processes are doubly stochastic in the sense that in a first step, the value of the random variable  is determined. This value then determines the "second order stochasticity" by increasing or decreasing the original intensity measure .

Properties 
Conditional on  mixed Poisson processes have the intensity measure  and the Laplace transform
.

Sources 

Poisson point processes